"Cruisin'" is a 1979 single written, produced, and performed by American singer-songwriter Smokey Robinson for Motown Records' Tamla label. One of Robinson's most successful singles outside of his work with the Miracles, "Cruisin'" hit number one on the U.S. Cash Box Top 100 and was also a Billboard Hot 100 hit, peaking at number four the week of February 2, 1980. It was a top-five hit on the Soul chart as well.

Background
The song was co-written by fellow Miracle Marv Tarplin. "Cruisin'" was an even bigger hit in New Zealand, hitting number one on that country's chart. It is included on Robinson's ninth studio album, Where There's Smoke.... Reportedly, Robinson had a cold when he recorded the song. It was originally intended as a B-side for a remake of "Get Ready".

Charts

Weekly charts

Year-end charts

Certifications

D'Angelo version

Neo soul musician D'Angelo recorded a cover of the song for his 1995 album Brown Sugar. The cover was released as the album's second single on October 12, 1995, and was commercially successful charting within the top ten of the US R&B charts. the album reached sales of 500,000 copies in the United States by October 1995.
This version appeared in the third episode of the UPN sitcom, Moesha in 1996.

Composition and arrangement
"Cruisin", a cover of Smokey Robinson's 1979 hit of the same name, here features a predominant string section. The longest track on the album, it employs violin, viola and cello, as well as shakers and light percussion, while sleigh bells are featured in the chorus. Flutist Lauryn Vivino contributes with piccolo. The track also features steady piano-playing by D'Angelo, with Brooklyn Funk Essentials-member Bob "Bassy" Brockmann playing the trumpet.

Track listing
 "Cruisin'"
 "Brown Sugar"

Weekly charts

Gwyneth Paltrow and Huey Lewis version

Gwyneth Paltrow and Huey Lewis performed a cover of the song in the 2000 film Duets. The song is included on the soundtrack of the film and released as a single on September 11, 2000. The duet spent one week at number one on the US Adult Contemporary chart. It was an even bigger hit in Australia and New Zealand, reaching number one on both country's singles charts, and in Iceland, where it climbed to number four in November 2000.

Track listing
Australian and German CD single
 "Cruisin'" (by Paltrow and Lewis) – 4:51
 "Feeling Alright" (by Lewis) – 4:02
 "Beginnings / Endings" (by David Newman) – 1:59

Charts

Weekly charts

Year-end charts

Certifications

Other covers
 In 1988, crossover thrash band Beowülf covered the song on their album Lost My Head... But I'm Back on the Right Track.
 Canadian jazz singer Holly Cole included a cover of "Cruisin'" on her 1990 album Girl Talk.
 In 2001, saxophonist Jaared covered this song on his album Foreword. Three years later, the late bassist Wayman Tisdale included a cover of the song on his album Hangtime.
 Filipino acoustic band MYMP released their version on the album The Unreleased Acoustic Collection and again on Back to Acoustic in 2013.
 Japanese singer Maki Ohguro (大黒 摩季 Ōguro Maki) released her version on the 2007 compilation album Best of Best 1000.
 Coolio has also sampled this song. Although the verse lyrics are changed in his song, the chorus is the same.

Popular culture
In 2009, Essence magazine included the song in their list of the "25 Best Slow Jams of All Time".
Robinson's version appears in the 2013 videogame Grand Theft Auto V inside the radio station The Lowdown 91.1.
Robinson's version appears in a 2021 TV commercial for Allstate.

See also
List of Billboard Adult Contemporary number ones of 2000
List of Cash Box Top 100 number-one singles of 1980

References

External links
 Lyrics of this song
 

1979 singles
1995 singles
2000 debut singles
Smokey Robinson songs
D'Angelo songs
Gwyneth Paltrow songs
Cashbox number-one singles
Number-one singles in Australia
Songs written by Smokey Robinson
Songs written by Marv Tarplin
Number-one singles in New Zealand
Song recordings produced by Smokey Robinson
1979 songs
Motown singles
Hollywood Records singles
Tamla Records singles
Cooltempo Records singles
Rhythm and blues ballads
Soul ballads
1970s ballads